Sue Newman (married name Sue King) is a former squash player from Australia. She won the British Open in 1978, beating her fellow Australian player Vicki Hoffman in the final 9–4, 9–7, 9–2. Newman was also runner-up at the British Open in 1976, when she lost in the final to Australia's Heather McKay.

Sue represented Australia in the 1979 Women's World Team Squash Championships

References

External links
 

Australian female squash players
Living people
Year of birth missing (living people)